Robert Farah was the defending champion; however, Horacio Zeballos defeated him in the second round.
Feliciano López won the title, defeating Carlos Salamanca 6–4, 6–3 in the final.

Seeds

Draw

Finals

Top half

Bottom half

References
 Main Draw
 Qualifying Draw

Open Seguros Bolivar - Singles
2011 MS